Sin Ui-gun (born 1 October 1958) is a North Korean football manager.

Career
Sin was the head coach of the North Korea women's national team at the 2012 Summer Olympics.

References

External links
 
 
 Sin Ui-gun at Soccerdonna.de 

1958 births
Living people
North Korean football managers
Women's association football managers
North Korea women's national football team managers